The 1879 Cork County by-election was fought on 17 February 1879.  The byelection was fought due to the death of the incumbent Home Rule MP, McCarthy Downing.  It was won by the Home Rule candidate David la Touche Colthurst.

The main issues were Home Rule and fixed tenure for tenant farmers, with the Home Rule candidate (a Catholic convert) being backed by the Catholic church.

References

By-elections to the Parliament of the United Kingdom in County Cork constituencies
1879 elections in the United Kingdom
1879 elections in Ireland